The 1974 Women's Hockey World Cup was the inaugural edition of the Women's Hockey World Cup. It took place from 17 to 24 March in Mandelieu, France. The Netherlands won the title defeating Argentina in the final on 24 March.

Results

Preliminary round

Pool A

Pool B

Classification round

Ninth and tenth place

Fifth to eighth place classification

Crossover

Seventh and eighth place

Fifth and sixth place

First to fourth place classification

Semi-finals

Third and fourth place

Final

Winning Squad

Statistics

Final standings

References

Women's Hockey World Cup
International women's field hockey competitions hosted by France
Hockey World Cup
Hockey World Cup Women
World Cup